Gawamaa or Gawám'a is a Sudanese ethnic group. They are a large sedentary tribe in North Kordofan, and sections of them also helped form the Halafa sub-group of the Hawazma tribe, itself a sub-group of the larger Baggara group. According to British colonial administrator Harold MacMichael, the Gawamaa were one of six non-Hawazma tribes integrated into the Hawazma tribe in the mid-eighteenth century by way of an oath.

The number of its members is about 750,000. The members of this group speak Sudanese Arabic. All members of this group are Muslims.

References 

Ethnic groups in Sudan